Ivanka pri Dunaji is a village and municipality in western Slovakia in  Senec District in the Bratislava Region.

History
In historical records the village was first mentioned in 1209.

In the centre of the village is a large rococo style house, built in the third quarter of the 18th century. It was altered at the beginning of the 20th century, by order of the Hunyadi family. The building has a combination of romanesque and gothic elements on its facade, including oriels, balconies, windows, and a polygonal tower with an Art Nouveau style top. The house was originally surrounded by an extensive French-style park.

Geography
The municipality lies at an altitude of 135 metres and covers an area of 14.258 km². It has a population of 6,815 people.

Church of Saint John the Baptist
Church of Saint John the Baptist—current church in Ivanka pri Dunaji—is the third church in Ivanka.  The first one was built by the followers of Saints Cyril and Methodius. It was a simple church from wood. The second one was repaired in 1730. It was built from stone and wood. The building of today's church began in 1770 and the building of the tower lasted two years. The tower clock was bought from Vienna in 1880. In 1991 the roof was fully replaced.

Twin towns — sister cities

Ivanka pri Dunaji is twinned with:
 Pozořice, Czech Republic

See also
List of municipalities and towns in Slovakia

References

Genealogical resources
The records for genealogical research are available at the state archive "Státný archiv in Bratislava, Slovakia"

 Roman Catholic church records (births/marriages/deaths): 1729-1898 (parish A)

External links/Sources

https://web.archive.org/web/20071027094149/http://www.statistics.sk/mosmis/eng/run.html
Surnames of living people in Ivanka pri Dunaji

Villages and municipalities in Senec District